XHTM-FM is a community radio station in Tepalcatepec, Michoacán, Mexico. The station broadcasts on 107.9 FM and is known as Cultural FM.

History
XHTM began unlicensed operations on 99.5 FM on January 17, 2003. Upon receiving a permit to operate on 107.9 MHz in December 2004, Cultural FM moved to that frequency.

XHTM was off the air for a month in 2012 when lightning struck its tower and damaged its transmitter.

References

Radio stations in Michoacán
Community radio stations in Mexico
Radio stations established in 2003
2003 establishments in Mexico